Abdelfettah Boukhriss (born 22 October 1986) is a Moroccan footballer who plays as a centre-back for IR Tanger.

Club career
In 2004, he signed for FUS de Rabat. He has spent most of his career at the club. However, for a short period, he moved to Belgian Pro League side Standard Liège, where he managed one appearance, though he did play as they won the 2011 Belgian Cup Final.

International career
In 2011, he made his debut for the Morocco national football team.

Honours
Standard Liège
Belgian Cup: 2010–11

References

1986 births
Living people
Moroccan footballers
Footballers from Rabat
Standard Liège players
Raja CA players
Al-Wasl F.C. players
UAE Pro League players
Ittihad Tanger players
Morocco international footballers
Association football defenders
2012 Africa Cup of Nations players
Moroccan expatriate footballers
Expatriate footballers in Belgium
Expatriate footballers in the United Arab Emirates
Moroccan expatriate sportspeople in Belgium
Moroccan expatriate sportspeople in the United Arab Emirates